Escondido Adventist Academy (EAA) is a private, Seventh-day Adventist-governed Christian school in Escondido, California, serving students in grades K-12.  It is operated by a school board which represents the 14 Seventh-day Adventist churches in San Diego North County. It is a part of the Seventh-day Adventist education system, the world's second largest Christian school system. Escondido Adventist Academy is a part of the Southeastern California Conference of the SDA School System.

The school began under the name "Escondido Junior Academy".  It moved to West 9th Avenue in Escondido in 1956, where it operated grades 1–10.  Then in 1982, it added Kindergarten and grades 11 and 12 and a few new buildings.  It also changed to its name to "Escondido Adventist Academy" to reflect its new senior academy status.  In 2008, the school sold its 9th Avenue campus and moved to a new facility on Deodar Road, as part of a joint campus with the Escondido Seventh-day Adventist Church.

The school is accredited by the Board of Regents of the General Conference of SDAs and the Western Association of Schools and Colleges (WASC).

Academics 
EAA offers Choir, Chamber Singers, Art, Cooking, Music Ministry, and Yearbook as electives.  It also offers AP classes for Biology, Chemistry, Literature, and Calculus.

Athletics 
Escondido Adventist Academy competes in the Citrus-West League of the California Interscholastic Federation-San Diego Section (CIF-SDS).
High School athletics include Men's and Women's Junior Varsity and Varsity Volleyball and Basketball, and Varsity Flag Football, Softball, and Golf. 
Middle School athletics offers Men's and Women's Flag Football, Basketball, Volleyball, Soccer, and Softball.

Escondido Adventist Academy began its golf program in 2009 and in 2010 finished as league champions.  
The Hawks boys' basketball team has finished as league champions 8 times (’99, ’00, ’01, ’02, ’05, ’07, ’08, ’09) and the Lady Hawks have finished at the top of their league 5 times (’99, ’01, ’03, ’06, ’08). The girls' basketball team finished as CIF-SDS Division V runners up in ’08.

Curriculum
The schools curriculum consists primarily of the standard courses taught at college preparatory schools across the world. All students are required to take classes in the core areas of English, Basic Sciences, Mathematics, a Foreign Language, and Social Sciences.

Spiritual aspects
All students take religion classes each year that they are enrolled. These classes cover topics in biblical history and Christian and denominational doctrines. Instructors in other disciplines also begin each class period with prayer or a short devotional thought, many which encourage student input. Weekly, the entire student body gathers together in the auditorium for an hour-long chapel service.
Outside the classrooms there is year-round spiritually oriented programming that relies on student involvement.

See also

 List of Seventh-day Adventist secondary schools
 Seventh-day Adventist education

References

External links

Educational institutions established in 1903
Private high schools in California
Adventist secondary schools in the United States
Private middle schools in California
Private elementary schools in California
Education in Escondido, California
1903 establishments in California